The women's 110 metres hurdles event at the 2001 Summer Universiade was held at the Workers Stadium in Beijing, China on 27–28 August.

Medalists

Results

Heats
Held on 27 August
Wind:Heat 1: +2.2 m/s, Heat 2: +1.2 m/s, Heat 3: +1.1 m/s, Heat 4: +2.0 m/s

Semifinals
Held on 28 August
Wind:Heat 1: -1.3 m/s, Heat 2: -2.3 m/s

Final
Held on 28 August
Wind: +1.6 m/s

References

Athletics at the 2001 Summer Universiade
2001